Ida Moiseevna Nappelbaum (1900–1992) was a Soviet writer and photographer.

Her work is included in the collection of the Museum of Fine Arts Houston, the Museum Folkwang in Essen, Germany and the Pushkin Museum.

References

1900 births
1992 deaths
Soviet writers
Soviet photographers
Soviet women photographers
Gulag detainees
Soviet women poets
Soviet poets